Newbuildings or New Buildings is a large village in County Londonderry, Northern Ireland. It had a population of 3,381 in the 2011 Census. It is within Derry and Strabane district.

History 
The village was founded in the early 17th century as part of the Plantation of Ulster, on land allocated to the Worshipful Company of Goldsmiths of London. It remained a small settlement until the 1960s, until large amounts of social housing was built on adjoining townlands. Today, the village has four churches (Methodist, Independent Methodist, Church of Ireland and Roman Catholic). It also has two primary schools – one administered by the Western Education and Library Board, one by the Council for Catholic Maintained Schools. Newbuildings also has a post office, community association, retail units and a wide range of housing.

Newbuildings is represented in the Loyalist flute band scene by Pride of the Orange and Blue Flute Band, formed in 1979.

Geography
Newbuildings sits on an area of flat land between Clondermot Hill to the east and the River Foyle to the west.

It is within the parish of Clondermott & Glendermott. This parish is split into a number of townlands, whose names mostly come from the Irish language. Over time, the urban area of Newbuildings has spread into the following townlands:
Ballyore
Dunhugh (from Dún Aodha meaning "Hugh's fort")
Gortin (from An Goirtín meaning "the small enclosed field")
Kittybane (from Céide Bán meaning "white flat-topped hill")
Magheracanon (from Machaire Canánach meaning "plain of the canon")
Primity
Prehen
Rossnagalliagh (from Ros na gCailleach meaning "wood of the Cailleach")

Transport
Between 1900 and 1955 the County Donegal Railways Joint Committee had a station in Newbuildings, the line running from Stranorlar and other destinations and along the east bank of the River Foyle from Strabane (CDR) railway station to Londonderry Victoria Road. New Buildings railway station opened on 6 August 1900 and finally closed on 1 January 1955.

Sport
Newbuildings United F.C. plays association football in the Northern Ireland Intermediate League.

Newbuildings Cricket Club plays in the North West Championship

2011 Census 
Newbuildings is classified by the NI Statistics and Research Agency (NISRA) as being within Derry Urban Area (DUA). On Census day (27 March 2011) there were 3,381 people living in Newbuildings ward. Of these:
20.38% were aged under 16 years and 13.36% were aged 65 and over
48.27% of the population were male and 51.73% were female
58.72% were from a Protestant background and 37.90% were from a Catholic background
5.20% of people aged 16–74 were unemployed.
For more details see: NI Neighbourhood Information Service

Deprivation
According to the Northern Ireland Multiple Deprivation Measure (NIMDM) of 2005, of 582 wards in Northern Ireland, 'New Buildings' was ranked as the 259th most deprived.

References

 

Derry and Strabane district
Villages in County Londonderry
Derry (city)